The 1904 Delaware gubernatorial election was held on November 8, 1904. Though incumbent Republican Governor John Hunn was eligible to run for re-election, he declined to do so. Instead, as the intra-party battle in the Republican Party between the Addicks and anti-Addicks factions continued, Hunn stepped aside to avoid additional conflict. The Addicks, or Union Republicans, nominated Henry C. Conrad for Governor, while the anti-Addicks, or Regular Republicans, held out with their own ticket and nominated Joseph H. Chandler for Governor. On October 12, 1904, the two factions united and agreed to jointly nominate industrialist Preston Lea, a favorite of the Regular Republicans.

In the general election, Lea faced Chandler, the erstwhile candidate of the Regular Republicans, who refused to step aside for Lea and continued his campaign, and former State Senator Caleb S. Pennewill, the Democratic nominee. Lea ended up defeating his opponents by a decisive margin, though somewhat reduced from Hunn's victory in 1900.

General election

References

Bibliography
 Delaware Senate Journal, 90th General Assembly, 1st Reg. Sess. (1905).

1904
Delaware
Gubernatorial
November 1904 events